Great Gonerby is a village and civil parish in the South Kesteven district of Lincolnshire, England. The population of the civil parish at the 2011 census was 2,200. To its north is Gonerby Moor, part of Great Gonerby civil parish, and the A1 road.

Community

Great Gonerby, with about 825 houses, has a social club, village shop, post office, and the Recruiting Sergeant public house. Harry's Place, with seating for 10, is significant for being the smallest Michelin-starred restaurant.

The large parish church is dedicated to St Sebastian. It is part of the Barrowby and Great Gonerby Group of the Deanery of Grantham. The 2013 incumbent was Rev Peter Hopkins who retired in 2019. The Church currently runs without fixed ordained presence.

A house called Cromwell's Cottage takes its name from the tradition that Oliver Cromwell based his troops here before attacking Grantham.

The local inhabitants are known as 'Clockpelters', from the habit of trying to strike the face of the church clock with stones or snowballs.  The clock dates from 1897.

References

External links

 Parish Council
 St Sebastians church
 Primary school

Villages in Lincolnshire
Civil parishes in Lincolnshire
South Kesteven District